Yuneec Power Drive may refer to one of several electric aircraft motors:
Yuneec Power Drive 10
Yuneec Power Drive 20
Yuneec Power Drive 40
Yuneec Power Drive 60